Events in the year 1981 in Liberia.

Incumbents 
 Chairman of the People's Redemption Council: Samuel Doe
 Co-Chairman of the People's Redemption Council
Thomas Weh Syen (until August 14)
Nicholas Podier (after August 14)
 Chief Justice: Emmanuel Gbalazeh

Events

 April 12 
The first National Redemption Day is celebrated, with Foreign Minister Henry Boimah Fahnbulleh giving a speech celebrating the anniversary of the 1980 coup.
The National Constitution Drafting Commission is formed, chaired by Amos Sawyer, with the goal of producing a new constitution.
 August 11 – United States Ambassador to Liberia William L. Swing presents his credentials to Chairman Doe.
 August 14 – Thomas Weh Syen and four other members of the People's Redemption Council are executed by firing squad for an attempted coup.
Full date unknown
September – Chea Cheapoo is relieved of his position as Minister of Justice.
The Daily Observer begins publication.
Liberia expels its Libyan diplomats.
Liberia's first ambassador to the People's Republic of China, John Daniel Cox, retires.

Births
 February 3 – Raj Panjabi, American physician and government official, in Monrovia
 December 6 – Kimmie Weeks, human rights activist

Deaths
 August 14 – Thomas Weh Syen, Co-Chairman of the People's Redemption Council, executed by firing squad

References 

 
1980s in Liberia
Years of the 20th century in Liberia
Liberia
Liberia